Sungai Siput is a federal constituency in Kuala Kangsar District and Hulu Perak District, Perak, Malaysia, that has been represented in the Dewan Rakyat since 1959.

The federal constituency was created in the 1958 redistribution and is mandated to return a single member to the Dewan Rakyat under the first past the post voting system.

This seat was formerly a stronghold for the Malaysian Indian Congress during the presidency of Tun Sambanthan and Tun Samy Vellu. MIC lost this seat in the 2008 general election and has since failed to regain the seat. MIC has previously represented this seat since its creation.

Demographics

History

Polling districts 
According to the gazette issued on 31 October 2022, the Sungai Siput constituency has a total of 38 polling districts.

Representation history

State constituency

Current state assembly members

Local governments

Election results

References

Perak federal constituencies
Constituencies established in 1958